The 2022 National League play-off Final, known as the Vanarama National League Promotion Final for sponsorship reasons, was an association football match played on 5 June 2022 at the London Stadium between Solihull Moors and Grimsby Town. It determined the second and final team to gain promotion from the National League, English football's fifth tier, to EFL League Two. By finishing first in the 2021–22 National League, Stockport County gained automatic promotion to League Two, while the teams placed from second to seventh participated in the play-offs. The winners of the semi-finals competed for the final promotion spot for the 2022–23 EFL League Two. The losing play-off quarter-finalists were Notts County and FC Halifax Town. In the following round, Chesterfield and Wrexham were eliminated in the semi-finals.

The match was televised live on BT Sport 1 HD and BT Sport Ultimate. The coverage was presented by Matt Smith, while the commentary team comprised Adam Summerton and Kevin Davies. Radio commentary was provided by Switch Radio and BBC Radio Humberside.

Ticketing
The National League were criticised before the game for their ticketing policy which resulted in a minimum ticket price of £40. Following complaints the league’s sponsor, Vanarama, gave £20,000 to both clubs to help supporters with costs. In addition 13,000 Grimsby fans were able to watch the game following intervention by the Mariners Trust supporters group which raised money for tickets.

Route to the final

Solihull won both regular season meetings between the two sides, 2–0 at home and 2–1 away.

Quarter-finals

Semi-finals

Details

References

play-off Final 2022
National League play-off Final
2022
Play-off Final 2022
Play-off Final 2022
Sports competitions in London
Events at the London Stadium